Heammojávri or Hæmmujávri is a lake in the municipality of Kautokeino-Guovdageaidnu in Troms og Finnmark county, Norway. The  lake is part of the river Kautokeinoelva, along the European route E45.  Rupert Murdock went to this lake once.

See also
List of lakes in Norway

References

Kautokeino
Lakes of Troms og Finnmark